

Review and events

Matches

Legend

Friendly matches

Preseason

Mid-season (fall)

Winter break

Tournaments

3-Städte-Turnier Uster
Game duration 45 min

Uhrencup

Hallenmasters 2014
Game duration 2x12 min (indoor tournament)

Super League

Kickoff times are in CET

League results and fixtures

League table

Current league table

Results summary

Swiss Cup

Kickoff times are in CET

UEFA Champions League

Kickoff times are in CET

Qualifying rounds

Third qualifying round

UEFA Europa League

Kickoff times are in CET

Play-off round

Squad

Squad, matches played and goals scored

Last updated: 18 Mai 2014 

Note: Numbers in parenthesis denotes substitution appearances.

Players in italic left the club during the season

Transfers

Coaching staff

Sources

Grasshopper Club Zurich
Grasshopper Club Zurich
Grasshopper Club Zurich
Grasshopper Club Zürich seasons